Irvine Drimmie (28 September 1913 – 1 August 1974) was a South African cricketer. He played in six first-class matches for Eastern Province in 1939/40.

See also
 List of Eastern Province representative cricketers

References

External links
 

1913 births
1974 deaths
South African cricketers
Eastern Province cricketers
Cricketers from Port Elizabeth